Paidia is a genus of moths in the family Erebidae erected by Jacob Hübner in 1819.

Species
 Paidia albescens (Staudinger, [1892])
 Paidia atargatis Lewandowski & Tober, 2009
 Paidia cinerascens Herrich-Schäffer, 1847
 Paidia conjuncta (Staudinger, [1892])
 Paidia elegantia de Freina & Witt, 2004
 Paidia griseola Rothschild, 1933
 Paidia minoica de Freina, 2006
 Paidia moabitica de Freina, 2004
 Paidia rica Freyer, 1858

References

Nudariina
Moth genera